Méréville is the name of the following communes in France:

 Méréville, Meurthe-et-Moselle, in the Meurthe-et-Moselle department
 Méréville, Essonne, in the Essonne department